Loring International Airport is the operational name of the airfield at the former Loring Air Force Base in Limestone, Maine, United States. It is currently (as of August 2022) operated by the Loring Commerce Centre. The airfield itself sits on 1,600 acres of land and is kept in good condition.

The Loring Air Force Base Arch Hangar is an arch hangar that was constructed by the United States Air Force as part of Loring Air Force Base. It was constructed at the same time as the base's double cantilever hangar, and was one of the largest monolithic arch structures in the world at the time of its completion.

References

External links

Airports in Aroostook County, Maine
Limestone, Maine
Loring Air Force Base